Rwanda competed at the 2004 Summer Paralympics in Athens, Greece. The team included one man and one woman. Competitors from Rwanda won one bronze medal to finish 73rd in the medal table.

Medallists

Sports

Athletics

Men's track

Women's track

See also
Rwanda at the Paralympics
Rwanda at the 2004 Summer Olympics

References 

Nations at the 2004 Summer Paralympics
2004
Summer Paralympics